John H. H. Phipps (a.k.a. Ben Phipps) (November 3, 1904 - April 1982) was an American heir, businessman, plantation owner, conservationist and polo player. He owned radio and television stations in Florida and Georgia.

Biography

Early life
His father was John Shaffer Phipps (1874–1958) and his mother, Margarita Celia Grace (1876-1957). He had two brothers, Michael Grace Phipps (1910–1973) and Hubert Beaumont Phipps (1906–1969), and one sister, Margaret Phipps Boegner (1906-2006). His paternal grandfather was Henry Phipps, Jr. (1839–1930) and his maternal grandfather was Michael P. Grace (1842-1920). He grew up at Old Westbury Gardens in Old Westbury, New York.

He attended Groton School, a private boarding school in Groton, Massachusetts, but he was expelled after he brought a skunk into the church. He transferred to Phillips Exeter Academy, another private boarding school in Exeter, New Hampshire. He graduated from Yale University, where he played on the polo team.

Career
He purchased radio stations in the Tallahassee area in the 1940s and in Georgia in the 1950s. He also owned the WCTV television station in the Tallahassee-Thomasville, Georgia area.

Conservation
He was involved with the Phipps-Florida Foundation, the Caribbean Conservation Corporation, and the Tall Timbers Research Station and Land Conservancy. He served on the board of trustees of the New York Zoological Society from 1941 to 1980. He was also a patron of the American Museum of Natural History.

He donated his land on Alligator Point, Florida to The Nature Conservancy for the study of birdlife. Additionally, he funded a research project to restore the sturgeon breeding grounds in the Apalachicola River and Suwannee River in Florida.

Polo
He played polo at the Gulfstream Polo Club, a polo club established by his family north of Delray Beach, Florida in 1923. In 1941, together with his brother Michael Grace Phipps, Charles Skiddy von Stade and Alan L. Corey, Jr., he won the U.S. Open Polo Championship at the Meadow Brook Polo Club against the Westbury team (Gerald Dempsey, Earle Hopping, Stewart Iglehart and Windsor Holden White).

Personal life
He was married to Elinor Klapp Phipps. They had two sons:
Colin Phipps.
Eugene Phipps.

They resided in New York City. Upon his father's death, he inherited the Orchard Pond Plantation. He also developed the Ayavalla Plantation in Leon County, Florida as a quail-hunting plantation. He died at the Tallahassee Memorial Regional Medical Center in April 1982.

References

People from Old Westbury, New York
Businesspeople from New York City
People from Tallahassee, Florida
Phipps family
Groton School alumni
Phillips Exeter Academy alumni
Yale University alumni
American polo players
American conservationists
1982 deaths
1904 births
Activists from New York City